John "Johnny" Rae (birth unknown) is a former professional rugby league footballer who played in the 1960s.

Playing career

International honours
Johnny Rae won a cap for Great Britain while at Bradford Northern in 1965 against New Zealand.

County Cup Final appearances
Johnny Rae played  in Bradford Northern's 17-8 victory over Hunslet in the 1965 Yorkshire County Cup Final during the 1965–66 season at Headingley Rugby Stadium, Leeds on Saturday 16 October 1965.

References

External links
!Great Britain Statistics at englandrl.co.uk (statistics currently missing due to not having appeared for both Great Britain, and England)
Photograph "Johnny Rae hands off" at rlhp.co.uk
Photograph "Toohey and Rae cover" at rlhp.co.uk
Photograph "A spot of bother" at rlhp.co.uk

Bradford Bulls players
Great Britain national rugby league team players
Living people
Place of birth missing (living people)
Rugby league locks
Year of birth missing (living people)
English rugby league players